Olaf III of Norway was King 1067–1093.

Olaf III may also refer to:

 Olaf Guthfrithson, King of Dublin 934–939
 Olof Skötkonung, King of Sweden 980–1022
 Olaf II of Denmark, sometimes numbered as III when counting a previous anti-king
Olaf Haraldsson